This is a list of telegram services by country.

References

 
History of the telegraph